Chandran Rutnam is a Sri Lankan filmmaker and entrepreneur.

Rutnam has hosted numerous Hollywood films for their location shoots in Sri Lanka and Malaysia. He was the Line Producer/Production Supervisor on several international productions including the Sri Lankan location shoot of Paramount Pictures' Indiana Jones and the Temple of Doom (1984) and Indochine (1992). He is the President and Chief Executive Officer of the Asian Film Location Services which mostly hosts foreign films to be shot in South and South East Asia.

Steven Spielberg once referred to Rutnam as "Our most valued friend in the Far East". Rutnam has also worked with Sir David Lean, Sir Carol Reed, John Boorman, George Lucas and Regis Wargnier.

Rutnam wrote the screenplay, produced, directed and edited the film The Road from Elephant Pass, which was a Finalist Award Winner at the New York International Television and Film Awards in 2011. He also wrote the adapted screenplay and produced and directed, A Common Man which starred Sir Ben Kingsley and Ben Cross. The film was nominated for the four main awards at the Madrid International Film Festival in 2013, winning the Best Picture, Best Director and the Best Actor awards.

Rutnam was the founder of Lionair, a defunct Sri Lankan airline, and owns the Asian Aviation Centre, an aeronautical engineering and flying academy.

Family
Rutnam was born to a Tamil father Dr. James T. Rutnam and a Sinhalese mother Evelyn Wijeyaratne. He lived in Los Angeles, California for 38 years and now resides in Colombo, Sri Lanka. He is a brother of Jayam Rutnam, the founder of the Sri Lanka America Association of Southern California (SLAASC).

Life and career
Rutnam was a school boy when David Lean arrived in Sri Lanka to shoot his Second World War epic, The Bridge on the River Kwai. The film crew hired a house that belonged to his parents for the shooting. Due to this exposure, to the consternation of his parents, he dropped out of school and went to London to pursue his dream of a career in films. He later moved to the United States and attended the film school at the University of Southern California and the San Fernando Valley College of Law. While working in Hollywood studios, Rutnam's break in selling Sri Lankan locations to international filmmakers came when he managed to convince John Derek, director of Tarzan the Apeman, to shoot the film in Sri Lanka rather than in Africa.

Rutnam also dreamt of making a mark in the aviation field. He stated, "I was the sort of guy who would go to an airport and watch the planes taking off. I remember as a kid, I went to the Colombo port and watched the ships coming and going out. I do not know whether it was wanderlust or freedom of movement. I do not know which one it was. Some years ago a friend of mine and I decided that we should have an airline." He founded Asian Aviation Centre and Lionair. Lionair was established in October 1993 and started its operations on 24 October 1994. Lionair suspended its domestic services when Lionair Flight 602, an Antonov An-24 aircraft went missing shortly after it took off from Jaffna in 1998, but resumed services in October 2002.

Filmography

Theatrical releases

Awards and nominations

Gallery

See also
 Evelyn Rutnam Institute for Inter-Cultural Studies
 Cinema of Sri Lanka

References

External links

 
 Uththareethara: Chandran Rutnam (documentary video)

Sri Lankan Tamil film directors
Sinhalese people
Living people
Film producers from California
American film directors of Sri Lankan descent
American male screenwriters
Sri Lankan emigrants to the United States
Sri Lankan Tamil film producers
1948 births
Film directors from Los Angeles
Screenwriters from California
American film editors